Nonoava  is one of the 67 municipalities of Chihuahua, in north-western Mexico. The municipal seat lies at Nonoava. The municipality covers an area of 2,693.3 km2.

As of 2010, the municipality had a total population of 2,849, up from 2,810 as of 2005.

As of 2010, the town of Nonoava had a population of 1,272. Other than the town of Nonoava, the municipality had 168 localities, none of which had a population over 1,000.

Geography

Towns and villages
The municipality has 59 localities. The largest are:

References

Municipalities of Chihuahua (state)